The 1994-95 Tampa Bay Lightning season was the third season in franchise history. The team traded away defenseman Shawn Chambers to the New Jersey Devils and forward Denis Savard to the Chicago Blackhawks; both players went on to have memorable playoff performances in 1995. Brian Bradley and Peter Klima both led the team in goals with 13, while Rob Zamuner led the team with 3 shorthanded goals. By April 21, the Lightning had a 17-22-3 record with only 118 goals against in 42 games. Although they had only scored 109 goals, Darren Puppa's solid goaltending kept the team ahead of the New York Islanders in the Atlantic Division standings. However, the Lightning finished the season with 6 losses in a row, getting outscored 26-11 to finish 17-28-3 for 37 points. An Islanders' loss to Philadelphia on May 2 ensured that the Lightning would not finish last place in the division.

Offseason

Regular season

Final standings

Game log

Player stats

Regular season
Scoring

Goaltending

Note: Pos = Position; GP = Games played; G = Goals; A = Assists; Pts = Points; +/- = plus/minus; PIM = Penalty minutes; PPG = Power-play goals; SHG = Short-handed goals; GWG = Game-winning goals; MIN = Minutes played; W = Wins; L = Losses; T = Ties; GA = Goals-against; GAA = Goals-against average; SO = Shutouts; SA = Shots against; SV = Shots saved; SV% = Save percentage;

Transactions

Draft picks

References
Lightning on Hockey Database

Tampa Bay Lightning seasons
T
T
Tamp
Tamp